The Turkey national under-18 football team is the association football team that represents the nation of Turkey at the under-18 level.

Current squad
 The following players were called up for the Football at the 2022 Mediterranean Games.
 Match dates: 26 June – 5 July 2022
 Caps and goals correct as of:''' 22 April 2022, after the match against

References

European national under-18 association football teams